The Osmonds were an American family music group who reached the height of their fame in the early to mid-1970s. The group had its best-known configurations as a quartet (billed as the Osmond Brothers) and a quintet (as the Osmonds). The group has consisted of siblings who are all members of a family of musicians from Ogden, Utah, and have been in the public eye since the 1960s.

The Osmond Brothers began as a barbershop quartet consisting of brothers Alan, Wayne, Merrill and Jay. They were later joined by younger siblings Donny and Jimmy, both of whom enjoyed success as solo artists. With the addition of Donny, the group became known as the Osmonds; performing both as teen idols and as a rock band, their peak lasted from 1971 to 1975. Their only sister Marie, who rarely sang with her brothers at that time, launched a successful career in 1973, both as a solo artist and as Donny's duet partner. By 1976, the band was no longer producing hit singles; that year, they transitioned into television with Donny & Marie, a popular variety show that ran until 1979.

A revival of the original Osmond Brothers lineup in the 1980s achieved moderate success in country music, and both Donny and Marie separately made comebacks in their respective fields in the late-1980s. The Osmonds have sold over 77 million records worldwide. 
The quartet continued to perform through their 50th anniversary in 2007, at which point Alan and later Wayne retired due to health issues; Jimmy was recruited after Alan's retirement, with the group performing as a trio until Jimmy suffered a stroke and retired in 2018. Alan's son David Osmond performed with the group in 2019. On 14 October 2019, the original Osmond Brothers quartet reunited for CBS' The Talk for their sister Marie's 60th birthday, billed as the last appearance for the lineup. The brothers performed "The Last Chapter", written as a farewell song and introduced in 2018. Donny & Marie ended an 11-year Las Vegas residency on November 16, 2019. Merrill and Jay continued to perform and tour, as does Donny as a solo artist. Merrill announced his retirement in 2022.

Early careers  

George Virl Osmond Sr. and Olive Osmond, members of the Church of Jesus Christ of Latter-day Saints, resided in Ogden, Utah with their family. They had nine children: Virl, Tom, Alan, Wayne, Merrill, Jay, Donny, Marie, and Jimmy. Virl and Tom were both born with severe hearing impairments.

The Osmond Brothers' career began in 1958 when Alan, Wayne, Merrill, and Jay began singing barbershop music for local audiences in and around Ogden. In their made-for-TV movie Inside the Osmonds, they explain that they originally performed to earn money to help buy hearing aids for Virl and Tom, and to finance their future church missions. Despite their young ages (ranging from nine to three years old), within a few years the boys' talent and stage presence were strong enough that their father took them to audition for the Lawrence Welk show in California. Welk was unable to meet with them at the time, but on the same trip, they visited Disneyland. Tommy Walker, Disneyland's Director of Entertainment and Customer Relations from 1955 to 1966, found the Osmond Brothers singing with the Dapper Dans on Main Street. Walker hired the Osmonds to perform on a segment of Disneyland After Dark, which first aired in April 1962. 

While the Osmond Brothers were working on Disneyland After Dark, Andy Williams's father Jay saw them and was so impressed he told his son to book them on his television show, The Andy Williams Show. Andy did, and the Osmond Brothers became regulars on the show from 1962 to 1969, where they earned the nickname "one-take Osmonds" among staff due to their professionalism and tireless rehearsing. Donny soon joined them on the show, making the Osmond Brothers a five-member group. Marie and Jimmy were also introduced on the show a few years later. During this time the Osmonds also toured Europe, performing with Sweden's most popular singer, Lars Lönndahl, and even releasing a single where they sang a Swedish version of "Two Dirty Little Hands" ("Fem smutsiga små fingrar").

The Andy Williams Show ended its first run in 1967, after which the Osmond Brothers were signed to The Jerry Lewis Show, staying with that show until it was canceled in 1969, after which they rejoined The Andy Williams Show, which had just returned for its second run. They soon decided they wanted to perform popular music and become a rock and roll band, prompting them to shed their variety-show image. This change was difficult  for their father, who was suspicious of rock and roll, but he was persuaded and the boys began performing as a pop band.

In 1967, the Osmonds recorded and released their first single, "Flower Music"  "I Can't Stop," for UNI Records. They achieved only modest success at first, but they found fame in 1971.

Pop and rock era

Bubblegum: Osmonds and Homemade  

Record producer Mike Curb saw the Osmonds perform as a band and recognized that they combined a rare mix of polished performing style, instrumental skill, and vocal talent. He signed the Osmonds to MGM Records and arranged for them to record at Muscle Shoals with R&B producer Rick Hall. Under Hall's guidance, the Osmonds hit the top spot on the pop chart with "One Bad Apple" in 1971. The song, "One Bad Apple", written by George Jackson, was composed in the style of The Jackson 5 (it was not originally offered to The Jackson 5, though the Osmonds would later state that The Jackson 5 considered recording it).The Osmond and Jackson families would eventually meet in 1972 and become friends. "One Bad Apple" debuted on the Billboard Hot 100 on 2 January 1971, first hitting No. 1 in February, where it stayed for five weeks. 

The Osmonds soon had hits with other light, R&B-style pop numbers like "Double Lovin'" (No. 14) and "Yo-Yo" (No. 3). In each of these hits, the formula was the same; Merrill sang lead, and Donny was "co-lead" in essence, singing the "hook" or "chorus" of the song. At this time the Osmonds also recorded several hits that were billed to Donny, the lead soloist on the songs: "Sweet and Innocent" (No. 7), "Go Away Little Girl" (No. 1), "Hey Girl" (No. 9) and "Puppy Love" (No. 3). Uni Records also re-released their 1967 single "Flower Music," this time with "I Can't Stop" as the A-side, where it reached No. 96. Their transition to pop stars required more elaborate choreography than their original work had required, so older brother Virl Osmond taught the quintet how to dance.

Transition to rock: Phase III and Crazy Horses  

The Osmonds began writing and performing their own music, and their sound moved towards rock music beginning with their album Phase III. In addition to "Yo-Yo", Phase III produced the major hit "Down by the Lazy River" (No. 4). Their Crazy Horses album was the band's first personal statementthe brothers have been quoted as saying that the title song refers to air pollution from cars, and its instrumentation featured an even harder rock sound bordering on early heavy metal. They wrote all the songs and played all the instruments with Alan on rhythm guitar, Wayne on lead guitar, Merrill on lead vocals and bass, Jay on drums, and Donny on keyboards. All the brothers sang backing vocals and an occasional lead on album cuts (Jay sang lead on some of the harder-edged songs, two of which were released as singles), but Donny largely switched to instrumental contributions for much of 1972 to accommodate his changing voice; by 1973, Donny had settled from his former boy soprano range into a smooth baritenor voice.

Donny's voice change was a major upset to the group's original formula for success, largely eliminating Merrill's young-sounding co-lead's voice and forcing Merrill's mature tenor voice to strain to cover most of the higher notes, with audible difficulty, through the next few years. The success of Crazy Horses singles "Hold Her Tight" (No. 14) and title track "Crazy Horses" (on which Donny did not sing, but did contribute with a prominent synthesizer riff) kept the group very popular through 1973. As the group toured, Donny continued to sing his solo hits, with the band progressively lowering the key until his voice change was complete.

With their clean-cut image, talent, and energetic pop-rock sound, the Osmonds toured to crowds of fans across the United States. By this time, the Osmonds had broken through in the United Kingdom as well: counting group and solo recordings, members of the Osmond family charted 13 singles on the UK charts in 1973. Some observers coined a new word, "Osmondmania", to describe the phenomenon, by analogy with the similar "Beatlemania" of the previous decade. The group also had their own Saturday-morning cartoon series in 1972 and 1973 , The Osmonds, on ABC-TV.

Emergence as teen balladeers: The Plan and Love Me for a Reason  

The older male Osmonds were of age to go on church missions, yet they believed they could reach more people through their music. They recorded an ambitious album in 1973 called The Plan, perhaps best described as a Mormon concept album with progressive rock aspirations. One reviewer suggested that The Plan carried a too-strong religious message, given that Mormonism is fairly conservative and not usually associated with the themes of rock-and-roll. The reviewer likewise suggested that the music was too varied and too experimental. The album produced only two minor hits: "Let Me In" and "Goin' Home" (both No. 36 in the United States, although they both went top 5 in the United Kingdom and "Let Me In" was also a major hit on the easy listening charts). 

Following the release of The Plan, the popularity of the Osmonds as a group began to decline. Alan, Wayne, and Merrill would all marry their wives in 1973 and 1974 (Donny married in 1978; Jay would not marry until 1987), and the band began to slow their tour circut. The Plan was also a major departure from the pop music which made them so popular. The combination of this album, along with Donny's voice change the year before, meant that the Osmonds' popularity with young fans would wane.

Another major factor in the band's decline was the sheer diversity of its output: within three years, the Osmonds had waffled between bubblegum pop, hard rock, and easy listening, and Donny's solo career as an oldies cover artist further muddled the band's direction. Donny's collaboration with Steve and Eydie, "We Can Make it Together" (which Alan, Wayne, and Merrill had penned for Donny), came out on the easy listening charts at the same time the much harder "Crazy Horses" song was charting.

Donny's solo career, and the emergence of Marie and Jimmy as spin-off acts  

Donny, Marie, and Jimmy soon began to emerge as solo artists. Jimmy was becoming "big in Japan", and in 1972 had a No. 1 hit in the United Kingdom with "Long Haired Lover from Liverpool". Marie, then 13 years old, hit No. 1 on the US country chart in 1973 with "Paper Roses" (a song originally recorded by Anita Bryant a decade before). Donny had a string of pop hits with covers of earlier teen-pop songs, including "Go Away Little Girl" (No. 1, originally by Steve Lawrence), "Puppy Love" (No. 3, a Paul Anka composition) and "The Twelfth of Never" (No. 8, originally recorded by Johnny Mathis). Between 1971 and 1976, Donny had twelve Top 40 hits, including five in the Top 10; for most of these, the Osmonds were still performing as a full band, but backing and giving star billing to Donny while he sang lead.

Donny's numerous solo hits have led many to assume he was the group's lead singer. Merrill was usually the lead singer; Donny would usually sing the choruses on songs billed to the Osmonds, thus being a "co-lead". (All five members of the group sang lead at various times; Jay would sing lead on some of the group's harder rock tunes, while Alan and Wayne would occasionally contribute a lead vocal on some album tracks.) Donny's emergence as a solo star and the record company's desire to appeal to the teen-girl audience often thrust Donny out in front of the group.

By now the family was touring, recording, creating, and producing for five technically separate artists: The Osmonds, Donny Osmond, Marie Osmond, and Jimmy Osmondplus Donny and Marie had begun recording duets and had hits with "I'm Leaving It Up to You" (No. 4) and "Morning Side of the Mountain" (No. 8). Through all the stress and pressures created by these many efforts, the family hung together. The 2001 ABC-TV movie Inside the Osmonds depicts the family mottoes as being "It doesn't matter who's out front, as long as it's an Osmond" and "family, faith, and career. In that order".

The original Osmonds as a group still produced hits. In 1974, "Love Me for a Reason" reached No. 10 in the United States and No. 1 in the United Kingdom. The Irish boy band Boyzone took the song to No. 2 in the UK in 1994. "Love Me for a Reason" was the title track to the album of the same name, which featured a blue-eyed soul format (their fourth style change in less than a decade) arranged by H. B. Barnum.

Fall from pop prominence: The Proud One and Brainstorm  

By 1976, though, the group's record sales were softening. Their 1975 album The Proud One sold poorly (despite the title track providing a chart-topping easy listening hit and the group's last US top-40 hit to date), and MGM Records was sold to PolyGram. Their first album on the subsidiary label Polydor was the album Brainstorm; that album sold only slightly better than its predecessor, and its lead single, "I Can't Live a Dream", fell short of the top 40.  Polydor would release two more albums from the family (a Christmas album that included all of the performing family members, and a greatest hits compilation).

Television era  

The Osmonds poured themselves into a new venture: the older brothers began producing The Donny & Marie Show which was a hit on ABC from 1975 to 1979. The family built and operated Osmond Studios, a first-class television studio in Orem, Utah, where the show was produced beginning in 1977. As a result, the Osmonds as a performing band became a lower priority to Donny and Marie. The older brothers deferred or gave up their dreams of being a rock-and-roll band, although Donny and Marie as a duo continued to record hits into 1978. In an interview with The Lost 45s, Wayne Osmond suggested their abandonment of songwriting and not working on material during the TV run may have been a mistake, as their career never recovered from the hiatus. Various members of the family struggled with the transition; Donny experienced stage anxiety, Merrill struggled with bipolar disorder, and Marie had a brief bout with an eating disorder after a network executive told her she looked heavy. Both Donny and Marie were offered roles in the 1978 film adaptation of the hit musical Grease, with Donny being considered for the role of the Teen Angel and Marie for the role of Sandy; Marie turned the role down, concerned that the character's rebellious turn at the end was not a fit for her. Donny and Marie instead chose to star in Goin' Coconuts, under the belief that it would be more family-friendly, which ended up being a critical and commercial failure.

The Donny & Marie Show was canceled in 1979, and the Osmonds found themselves in debt and without a clear direction. The group switched from Polydor to corporate affiliate Mercury Records and released another album, Steppin' Out, was a transitional album for the Osmonds and was produced by Maurice Gibb. Among its tracks was the first recorded version of "Rest Your Love on Me", a country song that would become a hit for Gibb's group, the Bee Gees, and topped the country charts in a cover version by Conway Twitty. Steppin' Out itself was a major failure, with the album failing to chart and its only charting single, "You're Mine," reaching only to No. 138 on the Record World charts; it would be their only album on the Mercury label.

The family also produced two unsuccessful projects for Marie, a sitcom pilot that never aired and a variety show revival that lasted seven episodes in 1980 and 1981. Donny permanently separated from the group (and, for a time, from Marie) shortly thereafter.

The Osmonds eventually paid their debts and re-established their careers. Rather than go into bankruptcy, they resolved to honor all of their financial obligations. However, the Osmond artists and enterprises began operating separately.

Later careers

Marie Osmond 

Marie recorded several successful duets with Donny and continued to sing country music; she had several Top 40 country hits in the mid-1980s, the biggest of which was "Meet Me in Montana" with Dan Seals (No. 1). She starred in the Broadway revivals of the musicals The King and I (as the lead, Anna) and The Sound of Music (as the lead, Maria) in the mid-1990s. She returned to television first in the short-lived 1995 ABC sitcom Maybe This Time and then with Donny in 1998 to co-host Donny & Marie, a talk-entertainment show that lasted two seasons.

Marie suffered from postpartum depression and wanted to help other women who suffered from it. In 2001 Marie, Marcia Wilkie, and Dr. Judith Moore wrote a book on postpartum depression titled, Marie Osmond Behind the Smile. Marie remarried her first husband Stephen Lyle Craig in 2011. She wore the same wedding dress after 26 years.

Donny Osmond 

Donny returned to the pop music scene in 1989; when he released "Soldier of Love" to much success in the United Kingdom, American music industry insiders were wary of the Osmond brand and promoted the song as being by a "mystery artist". The song became a turntable hit in this manner, and when Osmond's identity as the mystery artist was revealed, "Soldier of Love" eventually rose to No. 2 on the US charts and was enough of a success to warrant follow-up singles, including "Sacred Emotion", which peaked at No. 13, and "My Love Is a Fire," which peaked at No. 21. In 1998, Donny sang "I'll Make a Man Out of You" for the film Mulan. He performed on Broadway as Gaston in the stage production of Beauty and the Beast, and also gave over 2,000 performances as Joseph in the touring production of Joseph and the Amazing Technicolor Dreamcoat. He has hosted games shows in the United States and the United Kingdom (most notably the 20022004 revival of Pyramid and the British version of Identity), continues to appear on television, winning the ninth season (Fall 2009) of ABC's Dancing with the Stars, and still tours in the United States and England.

Donny & Marie's Vegas residency 
From September 2008 to November 2019, Donny & Marie performed a 90-minute show at the Flamingo Las Vegas. The show began in September 2008 and was originally scheduled to run for six months. The response was so overwhelming that the Flamingo immediately asked for a two-year extension. The Donny & Marie Show ultimately ran for 11 years, ending its run in 2019. Donny & Marie has been awarded “The Best Show in Las Vegas” for 2012, 2013, and 2014, according to the Las Vegas Review-Journal. The showroom was renamed "The Donny and Marie Showroom" in 2013.

The Osmond Brothers 
Jay Osmond was the primary choreographer for the Osmonds’ concerts and some television concerts.

Jimmy worked as a businessman and manager. He eventually moved to Branson, Missouri, and opened the Osmond Family Theater, where he and his brothers performed until 2002. They appear in Branson during the Christmas season.

Alan, Wayne, Merrill, and Jay later returned to using the name "the Osmond Brothers" and, building on the boom in country pop crossover artists and drawing from the success of the covers of "Rest Your Love on Me" from the previous album, started focusing on recording country music full-time. They had two top-30 Billboard Country hits in the early 1980s: "I Think About Your Lovin'" (No. 17) and "It's Like Fallin' in Love (Over and Over)" (No. 28), in addition to a handful that reached the bottom of or narrowly missed the top 40. The Osmond Brothers' record sales were hampered by a reluctance to go on tour; the group instead opted to stay in Branson, Missouri and promote their music through promotional music videos. The brothers continue to perform with various line-ups and sometimes with their children in Branson. Merrill performs and records as a solo artist as well; his biggest hit independent of his siblings was a duet with Jessica Boucher, "You're Here to Remember, I'm Here to Forget", a piece Merrill specifically chose to break from his family-friendly image (like Donny, Merrill had to hide his Osmond identity and recorded the song under the name "Merrill and Jessica") and which became a hit on the country charts in 1987. Alan has multiple sclerosis, and does not perform as often today; likewise, Wayne, who survived a brain tumor in 1997, retired from the group in the early 2010s. All of the brothers are married, some with large families.

 

Alan's eight sons started performing in the mid-1980s as "the Osmond Boys", later known as "the Osmonds—Second Generation". David Osmond, the fourth of those eight sons, has since emerged as a solo artist; he also performs as the lead of the Osmond Chapman Orchestra and frequently appears with his aunt and uncles in Osmond's performances.

In 20072008 all of the Osmonds went on a tour of Europe to celebrate the fiftieth anniversary of their career in show business. A special televised concert in Las Vegas (the only tour stop in the US), commemorating the anniversary, aired on US PBS stations on March 10, 2008. Alan played piano with the orchestra for most of the show and Virl and Tom provided signed lyrics for two songs. The Osmonds' long-time friend and mentor Andy Williams made a surprise appearance, reminiscing about how his father had told him to put the brothers on his variety show.

In 2009, Donny and Marie recorded a television special for the British channel ITV1: An Audience with Donny and Marie, part of ITV's long-running An Audience with... series was based on their Las Vegas stage show.

Both Donny and Marie tour extensively around the world, with Alan's son David occasionally filling in for Donny. Merrill, Jay, and Jimmy also sing together at the Suncoast Hotel and Casino in Las Vegas, along with some limited touring, mostly in the United Kingdom. Since Andy Williams's death, Merrill, Jay, and Jimmy took over operations of his long-running Christmas show, which they perform in Branson, Missouri in November. In 2012, the trio released their first studio album in 28 years, I Can't Get There Without You, which featured the recording debut of Jimmy as lead singer.

Alan and Wayne rejoined the group for one time only for what was billed as their last-ever performance as the Osmond Brothers at Neal S. Blaisdell Center in Honolulu in October 2018, a concert that also included Marie and David among the performers. Since that time, Merrill and Jay toured as "the Osmonds", sometimes appearing with Marie and David; in these shows (billed as "Marie and the Osmonds"), Jay and Merrill sing many of their old hits, and substitute for the late Paul Davis and Dan Seals on Marie's country duets. Jimmy toured separately with various projects at the time before suffering a stroke in December 2018; he stated in April 2019 that he was in good health and had decided to take a "long-overdue break" from performing. Alan and Wayne made a second "last ever performance" in October 2019, appearing on The Talk for Marie's birthday. In 2022, Merrill announced his retirement from performing; his final American show was in April 2022 and featured a special appearance by Donny.

Lack of radio airplay  

The Osmonds rank among the poorest performers in terms of having their hits of the 1970s survive in recurrent rotation; classic hits and oldies stations rarely play any of their music, with the occasional exception of "One Bad Apple." According to Sean Ross at RadioInsight, discussing the fifteen popular songs of 1971 that saw the biggest declines in airplay:

Teen acts had been with us from the beginning, of course, but not since the early ‘60s had they seemed so particularly stigmatized (...) Five songs by teen idolsfour of them Osmonds-related. We haven’t shown individual breakouts for every year of the ‘70s, but we can tell you that there’s an Osmonds-related song every year between 1971 and 1976, except for 1973, when Donny Osmond was being challenged by the DeFranco Family and didn’t have a big enough hit.

Ross later noted of the top 100 songs in the 1970 to 1974 period ranked by a drop-off in airplay, the Osmond family had six listed, the most of any collection of acts; this was twice as high as the next two artists on the list (Cher and Helen Reddy, each of whom recorded three). The Osmond family as a whole ranked the most neglected musical act of the era of the classic hit, from 1970 to 1994.  Broadening to the period of 1960 to 1999, the top 100 most neglected songs (which had a disproportionate number of early 1960s songs largely neglected by modern radio) had three performed by at least one Osmond, tied for the most with Connie Francis on the list; this was especially notable because other neglected 1970s artists such as Reddy and Barbra Streisand failed to make the broader list at all. Such was the Osmonds' fall into obscurity that Karen Osmond, Jay's second and current wife, had never heard of the group before meeting him.

Parents
Olive Osmond, mother of the Osmond siblings, died on 9 May 2004, at age 79. Their father, George Osmond, died on 6 November 2007, at age 90. The couple was survived by their nine children and 55 grandchildren as well as a number of great-grandchildren. Before George Osmond's death, plans were being made for him and the 120-plus members of the Osmond family to appear on The Oprah Winfrey Show to celebrate the family's 50th anniversary in show business. He died just a few days prior to the taping. The family ultimately decided to go on with the show as scheduled, and on 9 November, the entire Osmond family appeared on stage with Oprah Winfrey as a tribute to their father. The show aired the following day, the same day as George Osmond's funeral.

Hollywood Walk of Fame  

In 2003, the Osmond Family was honored for their achievements in the entertainment industry with a star on the Hollywood Walk of Fame.

Band Members 
The members of the band transitioned from exclusively vocal performance to playing instruments, all around the time that Crazy Horses was released.

Band members
 Merrill Osmond- vocals , bass guitar 
 Donny Osmond- vocals (1963-1979, occasional afterward), keyboards (1970-1979)
 Alan Osmond- vocals , rhythm guitar 
 Wayne Osmond- vocals , lead guitar 
 Jay Osmond- vocals (1958-2023), drums (1970-2023)
 Jimmy Osmond- vocals (1967-1972, 2007-2018)
 Marie Osmond- vocals (1973-1979, occasional)
 David Osmond - vocals (occasional, after 2007)

Discography

Studio albums  

 Osmonds (1970)
 Homemade (1971)
 Phase III (1972)
 Crazy Horses (1972)
 The Plan (1973)
 Love Me for a Reason (1974)
 The Proud One (1975)
 Brainstorm (1976)
 Osmond Christmas Album (1976)
 Steppin' Out (1979)

References

External links

 The Osmond Store Official website
 Merrill Osmond on Facebook
 Jay Osmond on Facebook
 
 Osmond Official Videos on YouTube
 The Osmonds Biography on YouTube
 The Osmonds Branson Show

Osmond family (show business)
American boy bands
American country music groups
American Latter Day Saints
American pop rock music groups
Asylum Records artists
Bubblegum pop groups
Child musical groups
Elektra Records artists
Families from Utah
Mercury Records artists
MGM Records artists
Latter Day Saint families
Musical groups established in 1958
Musical groups from Utah
Polydor Records artists
Sibling musical groups
Warner Records artists
Family musical groups
1958 establishments in Utah
American families of Welsh ancestry
Rock music groups from Utah
Teen pop groups
Utah culture